(434620) 2005 VD, provisional designation , is a centaur and damocloid on a retrograde orbit from the outer Solar System, known for having the second most highly inclined orbit of any small Solar System body, behind . It was the most highly inclined known object between 2005 and 2013.

Description 

This minor planet was discovered on 1 November 2005, by astronomers of the Mount Lemmon Survey at Mount Lemmon Observatory near Tucson, Arizona. Precovery images have been found by the Sloan Digital Sky Survey (SDSS) from September 2005 and December 2001.

Classification 

 has a semi-major axis greater than Jupiter and almost crosses the orbit of Jupiter when near perihelion. JPL lists it as a current centaur. Both the Deep Ecliptic Survey (DES), and the Minor Planet Center (MPC) have listed it as a centaur (qmin=~5AU) at different epochs. The DES and MPC will list as a centaur again in 2032.

Lowell Observatory also has it listed as a damocloid object.

 makes occasional close approaches to Jupiter, coming only 0.0817 AU from Jupiter in 1903, 0.0444 AU in 2057, and 0.077 AU in 2093. However the closest approach it will make in the next decade will only be 0.3089 AU on 17 December 2022.

Dynamics

Being a highly dynamic object, even among centaurs, 's orbit has visibly changed even since its discovery. Between 1600 and 2400, its semimajor axis will slowly increase from 6.64 to 6.96 AU, its eccentricity slowly increasing from 0.27 to 0.34, and a decreasing inclination from 176.7° to 169.9°. As such, until about 1870,  was the most highly inclined known asteroid in the Solar System.

References

External links 
 (434620) 2005 VD, Small Bodies Data Ferret
 
 

Centaurs (small Solar System bodies)
Damocloids
Unusual minor planets
Discoveries by MLS
20051101
Minor planets with a retrograde orbit